Sedanka Island is an island in the Fox Islands group of the eastern Aleutian Islands, Alaska.

References

Sedanka Island: Block 2001, Census Tract 2, Aleutians West Census Area, Alaska United States Census Bureau

Fox Islands (Alaska)
Islands of Aleutians West Census Area, Alaska
Islands of Alaska
Islands of Unorganized Borough, Alaska